William Patrick is an editor, book doctor, and ghost-writer, and the co-author of Loneliness: Human Nature and the Need for Social Connection.  He has also written two well-regarded suspense novels.   

He began his career at Little, Brown, then moved to Harvard University Press, where he acquired and edited works by the likes of Edward O. Wilson and Jane Goodall.  While working at Harvard he wrote Spirals (Houghton), a novel set in Cambridge during the early days of cloning and recombinant DNA research. His next work of fiction was Blood Winter (Viking), a thriller about germ warfare which the Wall Street Journal described as “A dazzling achievement, both gripping and moving, lurid and achingly sad….as authoritative as the fresh early best of Greene and le Carre.”   

Returning to commercial publishing, he acquired a number of bestsellers in humanistic psychology, including Minding the Body, Mending the Mind by psychologist and immunologist Joan Borysenko.  In 1991, he published Iron John: A Book About Men which was the #1 New York Times bestseller for ten weeks, and remained on the list for more than a year.  

A freelancer since 1999, he has helped shape a number of significant books including Tim Weiner’s Legacy of Ashes, winner of the 2007 National Book Award for nonfiction. That same year, The Measure of a Man, which he co-wrote with Sidney Poitier’s, was a selection of the Oprah Book Club that was #1 on the New York Times paperback bestseller list for 13 weeks. In 2013, he co-wrote In My Shoes with Jimmy Choo founder Tamara Mellon, and edited 10% Happier for ABC NEWS correspondent Dan Harris.

References

External links

www.williampatrickedit.com

Year of birth missing (living people)
Living people
Harvard University staff
American print editors